Belopolskya (minor planet designation: 1004 Belopolskya), provisional designation , is a dark Cybele asteroid from the outermost region of the asteroid belt, approximately  in diameter. It was named for Russian astrophysicist Aristarkh Belopolsky.

Discovery 
Belopolskya was discovered on 5 September 1923, by Russian astronomer Sergey Belyavsky at Simeiz Observatory on the Crimean peninsula. Eight nights later, the body was independently discovered by Karl Reinmuth at Heidelberg in Germany.

The body's observation arc begins with the above-mentioned Heidelberg-observation following its official discovery.

Classification and orbit 
Belopolskya orbits the Sun at a distance of 3.1–3.7 AU once every 6 years and 3 months (2,292 days). Its orbit has an eccentricity of 0.09 and an inclination of 3° with respect to the ecliptic. With these orbital parameters, it belongs to the Cybele asteroids, a dynamical group named after one of the largest asteroids, 65 Cybele.

Physical characteristics 
Belopolskya is classified as a PF-type asteroid in the Tholen taxonomy, a subtype of the dark and reddish P-type asteroids. A few dozens of these bodies are known, most of them are Jupiter trojans or reside in the outermost main-belt.

Diameter and albedo 
According to the surveys carried out by the Infrared Astronomical Satellite IRAS and the Japanese Akari satellite, Belopolskya measures 71.60 and 79.83 kilometers in diameter, and its surface has an albedo of 0.0348 and 0.028, respectively. The Collaborative Asteroid Lightcurve Link adopts the shorter diameter obtained by IRAS.

Rotation period 
A rotational lightcurve of Belopolskya, obtained by Italian amateur astronomer Silvano Casulli in July 2010, gave a rotation period of 9.44 hours with a brightness variation of 0.14 magnitude. No other lightcurves have been obtained.

Naming 
This minor planet was named in honor of Aristarkh Belopolsky (1854–1934), astrophysicist at Pulkovo Observatory, the principal astronomical observatory of the Russian Academy of Sciences, which is located south of Saint Petersburg in Russia. Belopolsky is also honored by the lunar crater Belopol'skiy. Naming citation was first mentioned in The Names of the Minor Planets by Paul Herget in 1955.

References

External links 
 Asteroid Lightcurve Database (LCDB), query form (info )
 Dictionary of Minor Planet Names, Google books
 Asteroids and comets rotation curves, CdR – Observatoire de Genève, Raoul Behrend
 Discovery Circumstances: Numbered Minor Planets (1)-(5000) – Minor Planet Center
 
 

001004
Discoveries by Sergei Belyavsky
Named minor planets
001004
19230905